Elko Tract is a 2,220 acre (9 km²) tract of land in Henrico County, Virginia. It is considered one of Virginia's ghost towns due to its history as a decoy airfield during World War II, then partially developed as an African-American mental hospital, before that project was abandoned.

World War II

The history of the Tract prior to World War II is unremarkable. During the war, however, the area was converted into a false city, its structure closely resembling that of Richmond. Richmond sat nearby to the west of the tract. It is widely accepted that the premise behind the work was to serve as a decoy for German or Japanese bombers on night raids. In theory, when reports would come from the eastern Virginia cities that enemy bombers were flying overhead, the city would cut power to its residents and businesses. At the same time, the lights would come up on Elko Tract - roads built in roughly the same pattern as the city, and a false landing strip arranged identically to the nearby airport, would convince the bombers that they had reached their target. The bombs would then harmlessly fall on an uninhabited stretch of land, and the bombers would return, thinking they had successfully attacked Richmond.

World War II ended without any attempt by the Axis Powers to attack Richmond. Control of the land then passed to the Commonwealth of Virginia.

References

External links
 A 1994 article on Elko Tract - possible theories on the 1960s and 1970s use
 A 2002 followup with extensive exploration information and photos from inside the Tract
 Satellite picture from Google Maps - the white dot in the center is believed to be the 1953 water tower
 Live Local satellite view - older imagery without the technology parks
 More info about the decoy airfield, including a picture of the 1955 "Bombing Practice" landing plate

Geography of Henrico County, Virginia
Ghost towns in Virginia
United_States_home_front_during_World_War_II